Tate's shrew rat (Tateomys rhinogradoides) is a species of rodent in the family Muridae.
It is found only in central Sulawesi, Indonesia, where it has been recorded on Mount Latimodjong (Mount Rantemario), Mount Tokala, and Mount Nokilalaki. The species is named after American zoologist George Henry Hamilton Tate.

References

Tateomys
Rodents of Sulawesi
Rats of Asia
Mammals described in 1969
Taxonomy articles created by Polbot